George Poonkhin Khut is an Australian artist, academic and interaction-designer working across the fields of electronic art, design and health, at UNSW Art & Design, University of New South Wales in Australia.

References 

Australian artists
Living people
Year of birth missing (living people)